Club Halcones de Zapopan, formerly Club Deportivo Zap, is a Mexican professional football team based in Zapopan but plays in Zapotlanejo which originally played in the Liga de Balompié Mexicano, and in July 2021 was affiliated into Liga Premier de México – Serie A.

History 
In May 2020 the team began its registration to be part of the inaugural season of the Liga de Balompié Mexicano. On June 12 their incorporation into the new league was made official, in addition to announcing the Tres de Marzo Stadium as their stadium. On June 20, Jorge Hernández González was announced as the first team's manager. On July 18, Jesús Roberto Chávez was presented as the first player in the club's history.

On December 30, 2020, the team withdrew from the season due to financial problems, planning to come back next season as long as the league had adjustments in its structure and had financial stability, however, on January 12, 2021 the team left the LBM due to lack of compliance with the league board and announced their goal of seeking to join another competition.

On June 1, 2021, the club announced changes in its structure, the team was renamed Club Deportivo Zap and was relocated to Zapotlanejo, Jalisco, 45 km from its original location, this with the aim of obtaining its affiliation to the Liga Premier de México, affiliated with the Mexican Football Federation. On July 30, 2021, the team was confirmed as a member of the Serie A de México, being placed in Group 2.

On May 25, 2022, the club returned to its original name, Halcones de Zapopan.

Stadium 
The Estadio Miguel Hidalgo, is situated in Zapotlanejo, Jalisco, a neighboring municipality of the Guadalajara metropolitan area. The stadium has a capacity of 1,700. In its history it has hosted matches of Primera División "A", Second Division and Third Division. Between 2006 and 2008 it was the field of Académicos de Atlas, an Atlas F.C. reserves team that played in the Primera División "A".

Players

First-team squad

Reserve teams
Halcones de Zapopan
 Reserve team that plays in the Liga TDP, the fourth level of the Mexican league system.

References 

Association football clubs established in 2020
2020 establishments in Mexico
Football clubs in Jalisco
Liga Premier de México